Mats Lavander (born March 16, 1980) is a Swedish professional ice hockey player currently with the IF Björklöven team in the Swedish HockeyAllsvenskan league. He is the brother of ice hockey player Björn Lavander.

External links

1980 births
IF Björklöven players
Luleå HF players
Living people
People from Piteå
Swedish ice hockey right wingers
Sportspeople from Norrbotten County